Šolc may refer to:

 Antonín Šolc (1928–1996), Czech footballer 
 František Šolc (1920–1996), Czech French horn player
 Josip Šolc or Josip Scholz (1898–1945), Croatian footballer and member of the Croatian Home Guard
 , Czech physicist and inventor, the namesake of asteroid 3490 Šolc

See also